5040 may refer to:

 5040 (number), a number in the 5000s range
 A.D. 5040, a year in the 6th millennium CE
 5040 BC, a year in the 6th millennium BC
 5040 Rabinowitz, an asteroid in the Asteroid Belt, the 5040th asteroid registered
 Hawaii Route 5040, a state highway
 SIG GL 5040, a 40mm grenade launcher

See also